Duke is a surname meaning 'the leader' or 'son of Marmaduke'. It is the 856th most common surname in the United States.

Etymology
The first is that the surname Duke and its variant, Dukes, are both derived from the various Middle English words duc, duk, and douc, which all came from the Old French word "duc." This ultimately stemmed from the Latin dux, meaning "leader," and is a derivative of ducere, "to lead." The surname was evidently acquired by someone who was looked upon as a leader, not denoting one of noble birth since many captains or military leaders were titled landholders who would have taken their last names from their estates. The surname Dukes translates literally as "Duke's son."

Alternatively, it has been suggested by scholars that the surname is simply a shortened form of Marmaduke, which is from the Irish Maelmaedoc, meaning 'servant of Maedoc.' St Maedoc was a Christian missionary in 7th Century Wales and Ireland. As a Plantation surname, it can be found primarily in east Ulster and has been Gaelicised as Diúc.

References date back to the late twelfth century, with Herbert le Duc, a member of the Knights Templar, using the Gallicized version of the name. From 1190–1191, Roger le Duc was Sheriff of London, and three generations of his family succeeded him in this office. The Pipe rolls for Berkshire refer to Adam Duke in the year 1198, and in 1214 one Henry Dukes is recorded in the Curia Regis rolls for Warwickshire.

Dukes

Dukes is a patronymic form of the surname Duke that originated in medieval England, of Anglo-Norman origin. The meaning is derived from son or descendant of Duke, which was originally recorded le Duc, a term used to mean "leader" before it became associated with a specific rank of the nobility. It is an uncommon name; the 2000 United States Census showed it to be the 1,577th most popular surname, while the United Kingdom Census of that same year showed it to be the 1,749th most popular.

Earliest usage 
The earliest recorded uses of the surname include:
Ralph or Radulphus Dux in 1199, Buckinghamshire,
Arnold de Dukes in 1200, Cambridgeshire,
Henry or Henricus Dukes in 1214, Warwickshire.

History
Records indicate nameholders came to England during and in the decades following the Norman Conquest, but its usage became more common in the reign of Richard I and especially in the time of King John. In Queen Elizabeth’s long reign the surname often appeared among the rolls of her ennobled subjects who were prominently mentioned in the annals of her time.
		
Duke families were also found very early in Ireland. According to O’Hart’s Irish Pedigrees, Vol. II, some were residing in County Westmeath in the Fifteenth century. The will of one William Duke, of Kyllenagh, Kildare, recorded 1551, is found in the records at Dublin. After this early date, the family name appears with more or less variation in form, and with increasing frequency upon the pages of the Irish Public Records. Hanna, in his Scotch-Irish Families of Ulster, estimates that there were in 1890 within the province of Ulster 268 persons bearing the name Duke.

Thus the Dukes were one of the ancient families of England and of Ireland. They are among the earliest recorded by Burke in his pedigrees of the nobility and of the landed gentry. The first mention made of them by this authority was the aforementioned Roger le Duc, sheriff of London. The names of Duke and Dukes have been well-established in the Americas, with one of the earliest arrivals to New England being one Captain Edward Duke in 1634. Humphrey Dukes sailed to Barbados with his wife and servants in 1630.

Notable people named Duke
 Duke (Cambridgeshire cricketer), given name unknown, active 1831
 Annie Duke (born 1965), American poker player
 Basil W. Duke, Confederate general
 Benjamin Newton Duke, (1855–1929) American tobacco philanthropist
 Bill Duke (born 1943), African-American actor and director
 Bryce Duke, (born 2001), American soccer player
 Charles Moss Duke Jr. (born 1935), American astronaut
 David Duke (born 1950), American white-nationalist activist
 David Duke, (born 1978), Scottish footballer
 Donald Duke, former governor of Nigeria
 Doris Duke (1912–1993), American philanthropist
 Doris Duke (soul singer) (1941–2019), African-American gospel and soul singer
 Edmund Duke (1563–1590), English Catholic martyr
 Edward Duke (1779–1852), English antiquary
 Geoff Duke, English champion road racer
 George Duke (1946–2013), African-American singer-songwriter and musician
 George Duke (footballer) (1920–1988), English footballer
 Henry Duke, 1st Baron Merrivale, judge and Chief Secretary for Ireland 1916–1918
 James A. Duke (born 1929), American botanist
 James Buchanan Duke (1856–1925), American entrepreneur and philanthropist
 James "Red" Duke (1928–2015), American surgeon
 Jas H. Duke (1939–1992), Australian writer
 Jessamyn Duke (born 1986), American mixed martial artist
 John Woods Duke (1899–1984), American composer and pianist
 Kacy Duke, American fitness instructor and life coach
 Ken Duke (born 1969), American golfer
 Lynne Duke (1956–2013), American journalist and writer
 Matt Duke, English footballer
 Mike Duke, American business executive
 Norm Duke, American bowler
 Patty Duke (1946–2016), American actress
 P. J. Duke (1925–1950), former Cavan Gaelic footballer
 Raoul Duke, alter-ego to Hunter S. Thompson, used as both a character and a pen name
 Robert Duke, songwriter pseudonym of Joe Meek
 Robin Duke, Canadian actress and comedian
 Steve Duke, American saxophonist
 Vernon Duke, Russian composer and songwriter
 Washington Duke (1820–1905), American entrepreneur
 Wesley Duke, former American football player
 William Duke, Scottish lieutenant governor of Bengal
 Zach Duke, American baseball player

Notable people named Dukes
 Alan Dukes (born 1945), Irish politician
 Ashley Dukes (1885–1959), English playwright
 Ben Dukes, American independent Country music singer
 Bill J. Dukes, American politician
 Carol Muske-Dukes, American author and poet
 Chad Dukes (American football), former NFL and Arena Football player
 Chad Dukes (radio personality), co-host of the Big O and Dukes Show
 Cuthbert Dukes (1890–1977), English pathologist
 Daragh Dukes, musician and producer of Irish rock band Headgear
 David Dukes (1945–2000), American stage and TV actor
 Derrick Dukes, African-American wrestler
 Elijah Dukes, African-American baseball player
 Gordon Dukes (1888–1966), American track and field athlete
 Harry Dukes (1912–1988), English footballer
 Jamie Dukes, former professional football player and NFL Network analyst
 Joanna Dukes, English actress
 Kevin Dukes, American guitarist
 Leopold Dukes (1810–1891), Hungarian historian of Jewish literature
 Mike Dukes (1936–2008), American football player
 Paul Dukes (1889–1967), English journalist and MI6 officer
 Philip Dukes (born 1968), English classical viola soloist
 Ramsey Dukes, pseudonym of occultist Lionel Snell
 Rob Dukes, lead singer for American metal band Exodus
 Tom Dukes, former American baseball player
 Walter Dukes (1930–2001), African-American basketball player

Fictional Characters named Duke or Dukes
Heather Duke, a character in the 1988 teen film Heathers, and it's musical and TV adaptations

See also
 Duke (disambiguation)

References

Surnames of English origin
English-language surnames
Patronymic surnames
Surnames from nicknames